Alfred John Lill Jr. (January 1, 1880 - March 18, 1956) was the president of the Amateur Athletic Union and a member of the United States Olympic Committee for the 1936 Summer Olympics in Berlin, Germany.

Biography
He was born on January 1, 1880, to Alfred John Lill Sr. in Boston, Massachusetts. He married Mary V. Gleason.

In 1913 he was elected president of the Amateur Athletic Union running against George Franklin Pawling. He replaced Gustavus Town Kirby.

He was a member of the United States Olympic Committee for the 1936 Summer Olympics in Berlin, Germany. He and Governor George Howard Earle III of Pennsylvania and Mayor Fiorello La Guardia of New York City proposed an Olympic boycott.

He travelled to New Jersey to visit his daughter. He died on March 19, 1956, at the Somerset Hospital in Somerville, New Jersey.

Footnotes

1880 births
1956 deaths
1936 Summer Olympics
Amateur Athletic Union
United States Olympic Committee
People from Boston